Mark Sanford Granovetter (born October 20, 1943) is an American sociologist and professor at Stanford University. He is best known for his work in social network theory and in economic sociology, particularly his theory on the spread of information in social networks known as The Strength of Weak Ties (1973). In 2014 Granovetter was named a Citation Laureate by Thomson Reuters and added to that organization’s list of predicted Nobel Prize winners in economics. Data from the Web of Science show that Granovetter has written both the first and third most cited sociology articles.

Education
Granovetter earned a Bachelor of Arts degree in history at Princeton University (1965) and a PhD in sociology at Harvard University (1970). At Harvard his research was supervised by Harrison White.

Career and research
Granovetter is currently the Joan Butler Ford Professor in the School of Humanities and Sciences at Stanford and is the chair of the Department of Sociology. He previously worked at Northwestern University, the State University of New York at Stony Brook, and Johns Hopkins University.

The strength of weak ties

Granovetter's paper The Strength of Weak Ties is one of the most influential articles in social science, with over 60,000 citations according to Google Scholar.  Its thesis is that weak ties—acquaintanceships that are not reinforced by many mutual friendships—are especially pivotal in the flow of information.  It has become a core idea in the field of social networks. In marketing, information science, or politics, weak ties enable reaching populations and audiences that are not accessible via strong ties. The concepts and findings of this work were later published in the monograph Getting A Job, an adaptation of Granovetter's doctoral dissertation at Harvard University's Department of Social Relations, with the title: "Changing Jobs: Channels of Mobility Information in a Suburban Population" (313 pages).

In 1969 Granovetter submitted this paper to American Sociological Review, but it was rejected. Eventually this pioneering research was published in 1973 in American Journal of Sociology and became the most cited work in the social sciences.

Economic sociology: Embeddedness
In the field of economic sociology, Granovetter has been a leader since the publication in 1985 of an article that launched "new economic sociology", "Economic Action and Social Structure: The Problem of Embeddedness". This article caused Granovetter to be identified with the concept of "embeddedness", the idea that economic relations between individuals or firms are embedded in actual social networks and do not exist in an abstract idealized market. The concept of embeddedness originated with Karl Polanyi in his book The Great Transformation, where Polanyi posited that all economies are embedded in social relations and institutions. Granovetter also published a book called Society and Economy (2017).

"Tipping points" and threshold models
Granovetter has done research on a model of how fads are created. Consider a hypothetical mob assuming that each person's decision whether to riot or not is dependent on what everyone else is doing. Instigators will begin rioting even if no one else is, while others need to see a critical number of trouble makers before they riot, too. This threshold is assumed to be distributed to some probability distribution. The outcomes may diverge largely although the initial condition of threshold may only differ very slightly. This threshold model of social behavior was proposed previously by Thomas Schelling and later popularized by Malcolm Gladwell's book The Tipping Point.

Security influence
Granovetter's work has influenced researchers in capability-based security. Interactions in these systems can be described using "Granovetter diagrams", which illustrate changes in the ties between objects.

Publications
His publications include:
 
 
 
 - Reprinted in

References

1943 births
Living people
American sociologists
Princeton University alumni
Harvard Graduate School of Arts and Sciences alumni
Northwestern University faculty
State University of New York faculty
Johns Hopkins University faculty
Stanford University Department of Sociology faculty
Fellows of the American Academy of Arts and Sciences
Members of the United States National Academy of Sciences
Center for Advanced Study in the Behavioral Sciences fellows
Network scientists